Nuno Filipe Gonçalves de Sousa (born 17 January 1974 in Lisbon) is a Portuguese retired footballer who played as a forward.

Over 12 seasons, he amassed Segunda Liga totals of 246 matches and 67 goals. In the Primeira Liga, he appeared for Rio Ave FC (four games).

References

External links

1974 births
Living people
Footballers from Lisbon
Portuguese footballers
Association football forwards
Primeira Liga players
Liga Portugal 2 players
Segunda Divisão players
Clube Oriental de Lisboa players
C.F. Os Belenenses players
U.F.C.I. Tomar players
S.U. Sintrense players
U.D. Vilafranquense players
A.D. Esposende players
Rio Ave F.C. players
Gondomar S.C. players
F.C. Paços de Ferreira players
C.D. Feirense players
F.C. Vizela players
G.D. Estoril Praia players
C.D. Fátima players
C.D. Mafra players